is a 2017 Japanese nine-part horror television miniseries written and directed by Sion Sono. All episodes (episode 8 was split into two parts for streaming) were originally released on Amazon Video on June 16, 2017. A special feature-length cut running 2 hours and 22 minutes was shown at various festivals, including the 2017 Chicago International Film Festival. The theme song "Tokyo Vampire Hotel" is performed by the Japanese math rock band tricot.

Plot 
Manami is targeted by the rival vampire clans the Draculas and the Corvins on her 22nd birthday. That night, young men and women are invited to Hotel Requiem for a special coupling party held by Yamada, a Corvin vampire who lives in and operates the ornately beautiful, palatial hotel with his partner Elizabeth Báthory. Yamada declares to the gathered crowd that the world is ending and only the people inside the hotel will be saved. The Dracula vampire K, who possesses tremendous power, struggles against the other vampires to save Manami.

Cast 
Ami Tomite as Manami
Yumi Adachi as Empress
Megumi Kagurazaka as Elizabeth Báthory
Kaho as K
Shinnosuke Mitsushima as Yamada
Akihiro Kitamura as Gen
Ayumu Yokuyama as Dre
Nana Mori as Akari

Episodes

Development
The series was developed as part of a push by Amazon Prime Video to release more Japanese titles. James Farrell, head of Asia Pacific content, Amazon Prime Video, said, "Our focus is to work with the content creators to be innovative and deliver a content experience only available on Amazon. Right from the first episode customers will see something they haven’t seen before that’s awesome and different. With his unique voice and baroque style, Sono puts his mark on any genre." Sono himself said, "I had wanted to make an original vampire movie for a long time. I approached it as if making a movie. I am proud to say we've produced something that has never been done before either as TV drama or feature film."

Filming
In addition to filming in the elaborate hotel set constructed in Tokyo, Sono also convinced Amazon to let him film in Romania. The series features Bran Castle (commonly known as Dracula's Castle), the Salina Turda salt mine, and other spots in Transylvania, where Sono and his crew filmed for five days. "If we didn't film in Romania, the series wouldn't have any power," Sono told The Japan Times, "I had to do it. Just shooting in Tokyo would have been no good."

Release
All episodes were originally released on Amazon Video on June 16, 2017, with episode 8 split into two parts for streaming. A special feature-length cut running 2 hours and 22 minutes was shown at various film festivals, including the 2017 Chicago International Film Festival.

References

External links 
 Official website
 

Japanese television miniseries
2017 Japanese television series debuts
2017 Japanese television series endings
Japanese horror fiction television series
Films directed by Sion Sono
Television series set in the future
Television series set in the 2020s
Television series by Amazon Studios
Vampires in television
Films shot in Romania
Films shot in Tokyo
Amazon Prime Video original programming